Calvin L. Skinner, Jr. is an American politician who served two tenures as a Republican member of the Illinois House of Representatives from 1973 to 1981 and again from 1993 to 2001.

Early life
Skinner was born in Easton, Maryland on June 11, 1942. During his childhood, he moved to Illinois and attended Crystal Lake High School. He then attended Oberlin College and the University of Michigan where he earned a bachelor's degree in economics and a master of public administration. He accepted a job with the United States Bureau of the Budget. In 1966, at age 23, he returned to McHenry County and was elected county treasurer. During his time as Treasurer he became a Certified Illinois Assessing Officer.

Political career
Skinner was first elected to the Illinois House of Representatives as one of three members from the 33rd district with Republican R. Bruce Waddell and Democrat Thomas J. Hanahan. Skinner was an opponent of the Regional Transportation Authority citing the limited services provided to exurban residents and the risk to local autonomy. He did sit on the R.T.A. Legislative Advisory Committee. He left the legislature in 1981 and was succeeded by Republican Jill Zwick.

He later served another tenure in the Illinois House from the 64th district from 1993 to 2001. He was the Libertarian nominee for Governor of Illinois in 2002 with running mate Jim Tobin. They received 73,794 votes.

References

1942 births
Living people
People from Easton, Maryland
Republican Party members of the Illinois House of Representatives
Illinois Libertarians
University of Michigan College of Literature, Science, and the Arts alumni
Gerald R. Ford School of Public Policy alumni